Heydebreck was a Nazi Germany village area with POW camps Arbeitskommando E711A and Bau und Arbeits (BAB) camp 20 (renamed E794 in November 1944). Five km west in the Cosel district was a subcamp of Auschwitz III (Monowitz) operated from April 1, 1944 to January 26, 1945.  In February and March 1944, 800 POWs from Monowitz Arbeitskommando E715 were transferred to chemical facilities in the area of Blechhammer, Cosel, and Heydebreck.

Heydebreck chemical facilities included a Bergius hydrogenation plant (3300 tons/month), a Kybol plant, a Methanol plant, a Nitrogen plant, a Butanol plant, an Oppanol plant, and (as at Oppau) a Tanol plant.  As a target of the Oil Campaign of World War II, Heydebreck was first bombed in June 1944.

A shooting of British POWs at Heydebreck was studied post-war.

References 

Auschwitz concentration camp
Oil campaign of World War II